Events from the year 1935 in Sweden

Incumbents
 Monarch – Gustaf V
 Prime Minister – Per Albin Hansson

Births

 19 August – Sun Axelsson, novelist (died 2011)
 3 September – Assar Rönnlund, cross-country skier (died 2011). 
 22 September – Eilert Määttä, ice hockey player (died 2011).

Exact date unknown 
 Erik Beckman, poet, novelist and playwright (died 1995).
 Per Agne Erkelius, novelist, playwright and teacher (died 2010).

Deaths
 9 January - Dina Edling, opera singer (born 1854)
 27 January – Anna Boberg, artist (born 1864)
 2 February – Calla Curman, literary personality  (born 1850)
 26 February – Hilda Sachs, journalist  (born 1857)
 19 October - Maria Cederschiöld, journalist and suffragette (born 1856)
 21 December — Kurt Tucholsky, German journalist, satirist and writer (born 1890)
 30 December – Gertrud Månsson, politician  (born 1866)

References

 
1930s in Sweden
Years of the 20th century in Sweden
Sweden
Sweden